The Northfield Falls Covered Bridge, also called the Station Covered Bridge, is a wooden covered bridge that carries Cox Brook Road across the Dog River in Northfield, Vermont. Built in 1872, this Town lattice truss bridge is one of five surviving covered bridges in the town, and one of two that are visible from each other (the other is the Lower Cox Brook Covered Bridge). It was listed on the National Register of Historic Places in 1974.

Description and history
The Northfield Falls Covered Bridge is located in the village of Northfield Falls of northern Northfield, a short way west of Vermont Route 12 on Cox Brook Road. It spans the Dog River in an east–west orientation, and is located just a few hundred feet east of the Lower Cox Brook Covered Bridge, which spans the eponymous brook. It is a single-span Town lattice truss, which has been reinforced by the introduction of a central pier. It is covered by a metal gabled roof, and its exterior is sheathed in vertical board siding. The siding extends around a short way inside the portals to shelter the ends of the trusses, and extends upward only partway to the roof eave, leaving an open strip between them. The bridge rests on stone abutments faced in concrete.

The bridge was built in 1872; its designed is unknown. In 1963 the bridge deck was strengthened by the addition of 4 steel -beams underneath, and the unmortared stone abutments were faced with concrete.

See also
 
 
 
 
 List of covered bridges in Vermont
 National Register of Historic Places listings in Washington County, Vermont
 List of bridges on the National Register of Historic Places in Vermont

References

Buildings and structures in Northfield, Vermont
Bridges completed in 1872
Covered bridges on the National Register of Historic Places in Vermont
Wooden bridges in Vermont
Covered bridges in Washington County, Vermont
National Register of Historic Places in Washington County, Vermont
Road bridges on the National Register of Historic Places in Vermont
Lattice truss bridges in the United States
1872 establishments in Vermont